Newman Creek is a stream in the U.S. state of Ohio.

Newman Creek has the name of Jacob Newman, a government surveyor.

See also
List of rivers of Ohio

References

Rivers of Stark County, Ohio
Rivers of Wayne County, Ohio
Rivers of Ohio